Krzysztof Ratajczyk (born 9 November 1973 in Poznań) is a Polish football  defender.

Club career
He started his career at Warta Poznań. After five years at Legia Warsaw, he moved to Rapid Wien in 1996, where he was most successful. He was very popular , especially because of his hard style to play (for example: he knocked an opponent forward into the third seat row in a pre-season match) and became captain of the side.

Although Rapid renewed his contract despite many long-term injuries, Ratajczyk moved in 2002 (as skipper of the team) to bitter rivals Austria Wien. As a result of this "betrayal", feelings ran high and he was beaten down by four Rapid Fans.

Ratajczyk joined Mattersburg in 2005, where he spent two years. In January 2008 he had no contract until the Red Zac league SC Schwanenstadt offered him one. After Schwanenstadt's demise, he moved to FAC Team für Wien in the Regionalliga.

International career
He made his debut for Poland in an August 1994 friendly match against Belarus and went on to earn 16 caps, scoring 3 goals.

Honours
Polish League (2):
 1994, 1995
Polish Cup (2):
 1994, 1995
Austrian Football Bundesliga (1):
 2003
Austrian Cup (2):
 2003, 2005

External links
 
 
 Player profile - Austria Archive
 Rapid stats - Rapid Archive

1973 births
Living people
Footballers from Poznań
Polish footballers
Poland international footballers
Warta Poznań players
Legia Warsaw players
SK Rapid Wien players
FK Austria Wien players
SV Mattersburg players
SC Schwanenstadt players
Austrian Football Bundesliga players
Expatriate footballers in Austria
Association football defenders
Floridsdorfer AC players